The Mainair Blade is a British ultralight trike that was designed and produced by Mainair Sports and later P&M Aviation. The aircraft was supplied as a completed aircraft.

In the early 2000s Mainair was merged with rival Pegasus Aviation into P&M Aviation, but production of the Blade continued. As the company rationalized the two aircraft lines, Blade production ended. By 2012 the manufacturer indicated, "This aircraft is no longer in production...Full spares and support are still available and will remain so for the foreseeable future. Complete aircraft can still be manufactured but by special request only."

Design and development
It features a cable-braced hang glider-style high-wing, weight-shift controls, a two-seats-in-tandem, open cockpit, tricycle landing gear and a single engine in pusher configuration.

The aircraft is made from bolted-together aluminium tubing, with its double-surface wing covered in Dacron sailcloth. Its  span wing is supported by a single tube-type kingpost and uses an "A" frame control bar. The occupants are accommodated in tandem seating, with a fibreglass cockpit fairing that includes a small windshield. Engines factory supplied include the  Rotax 503 twin cylinder, two-stroke, air cooled powerplant as well as the twin cylinder, two-stroke, liquid cooled  Rotax 582 and the four cylinder, four-stroke  Rotax 912UL and  Rotax 912ULS.

Operational history
Blades have been used for a number of microlight record distance flights, including a flight to Australia by Colin Bodill and Simon Reeve and a flight around the world by Bodhill.

Variants
Blade 582
Version powered by a  Rotax 582 engine. Price in 2003 was £16,450.
Blade 912
Version powered by a  Rotax 912UL or the  Rotax 912ULS. In 2003 it was reported that the Blade 912 accounted for the majority of customer orders. Price in 2003 was £21,800.

Specifications (Blade 912)

References

External links

Mainair Blade
1990s British ultralight aircraft
Single-engined pusher aircraft
Ultralight trikes